Ferdinand Hurter (1844–1898) and Vero Charles Driffield (1848–1915) were nineteenth-century photographic scientists who brought quantitative scientific practice to photography through the methods of sensitometry and densitometry.

Among their other innovations was a photographic exposure estimation device known as an actinograph.

See also
H&D speed numbers, originally described in 1890, for film speed measurements

References

External links 
 A brief history of Hurter and Driffield by Ron Callender in Encyclopedia of Nineteenth-century Photography 2008 pp.732-4

History of photography